There are over 20,000 Grade II* listed buildings in England. As the county of Herefordshire contains 356 of these sites they have been split into alphabetical order.

Grade II* listed buildings in Herefordshire (A–L)
Grade II* listed buildings in Herefordshire (M–Z)

See also
 Grade I listed buildings in Herefordshire

 
Herefordshire1